Westwood station may refer to:

 Westwood station (LIRR), a commuter rail station in Hempstead, New York, on the Long Island Rail Road's West Hempstead Branch
 Westwood station (NJ Transit), a commuter rail station in Westwood, New Jersey, on NJ Transit Rail Operations' Pascack Valley Line
 Westwood/Rancho Park station, a light rail station in Los Angeles, California, on the Los Angeles Metro Rail's E Line
 Westwood/UCLA station, a planned rapid transit station in Los Angeles, California, on the Los Angeles Metro Rail's D Line